Aharon Pfeuffer (אהרן פפויפר, also "Pfoifer";  1949–1993) was a Rabbi and Posek, and a recognized authority on Kashrut.

Pfeuffer studied in  various Yeshivot, primarily Hebron and HaNegev in Israel, as well as Lakewood in the US; 
he later studied in chavruta with Shmuel Rozovsky, famed Rosh Yeshiva (dean) of Ponevezh, and came to consider him his primary Rabbi.
He received Semicha, Rabbinic ordination, from Tzvi Kushelevsky. 
He was active in Israel, London,  and then Johannesburg:
He taught in yeshivot in Hadera and Kfar Haroeh;
He 
co-headed the Etz Chaim Yeshiva (London) from 1976; 
He founded and headed the Yeshiva Maharsha Beis Aharon  from 1982 (later named "Beis Aharon" for him), and lead the Yeshiva gedolah program  at the Yeshiva College of South Africa in the early 1980s. 
He died in a car accident on his way to the Kruger National Park.

Rabbi Pfeuffer produced several scholarly works. He is best known for his series on Kashrut, with volumes titled, e.g., Kitzur Shulchan Aruch al Hilchos Basar be-Chalav. These explicate the Halacha (law) for the major Rabbinic topics here (with one on Niddah also ) and are often recommended as a resource for students preparing for Semicha.
These were later popularized in a graphical and tabular format published in both Hebrew   and English.  Rabbi Pfeuffer also authored "Zichron Menachem"  and "Ohr Aharon" comprising, largely, "shiurim and chidushim" on various Talmudic tractates, the latter work produced during his years as Rosh Yeshiva.

Refrerences

1949 births
1993 deaths
20th-century English rabbis
Haredi rabbis in Israel
Rosh yeshivas
South African Orthodox rabbis